A border is a geographical boundary.

Border, borders, The Border or The Borders may also refer to:

Arts, entertainment and media

Film and television

 Border (1997 film), an Indian Hindi-language war film
 Border (2018 Swedish film), a fantasy film
 Border (2018 Bhojpuri film), a war film
 The Border (1982 film), an American drama
 The Border (1996 film), an Italian war drama
 The Border (2007 film), a Finnish-Russian war drama 
 The Border (2009 film), a Slovak documentary
 The Border (TV series) a 2008–10 Canadian drama series

Literature
 "The Border", a 2004 short story by Richard Harland
 "The Border", a 2019 novel by Don Winslow

Music
 "Border" (song), by Years & Years, 2015
 "Borders" (Feeder song), 2012
 "Borders" (M.I.A. song), 2015
 "Borders" (The Sunshine Underground song), 2007
 The Border, soundtrack to the 1982 film, by Ry Cooder
 "The Border" (America song), 1983
 "The Border" (Mr. Mister song), 1987
 "The Border" (America song), 1983
 "The Borders" (song), a 2019 song by Sam Fender

Radio and television broadcasters
 ITV Border, previously Border Television, a British television station
 Triple M The Border, a radio station in the Victoria/New South Wales border area, Australia
 WCRQ, The Border, a radio station in Maine, U.S., that spans the U.S. and Canada border

People
 Allan Border (born 1955), Australian cricketer and commentator
 Larry Border (1951–2011), American politician from West Virginia
 Beau Borders (fl. from 2014), American sound engineer
 Gloria Borders (fl. from 1982), American sound editor
 Ila Borders (born 1975), American baseball player
 Lisa Borders (born 1957), American politician and executive
 Pat Borders (born 1963), American baseball player
 William Donald Borders (1913–2010), American archbishop

Places
 Border, Eastern Cape, a region of South Africa
 Border, Utah, U.S.
 Border Village, South Australia, Australia
 Parish of Border, New South Wales, Australia
 Border country, or the Anglo-Scottish border
 Scottish Borders, or The Borders, an area of Scotland
 Border Region, a NUTS statistical region of Ireland
 Penrith and The Border (UK Parliament constituency), in England

Sport
 Allan Border Medal, a cricket award in Australia
 Border Bulldogs, a South African rugby union team
 Border (cricket team), in South Africa
 Border Reivers (rugby union), or The Borders, a Scottish team

Other uses
 Border Group, a sequence of rock strata in southern Scotland 
 Borders Group, a defunct American international bookseller
 Borders (Asia Pacific)
 Borders (UK)
 Border, part of an Oriental rug
 Border disease, is a viral disease of sheep and goats
 a long and narrow flowerbed, planted with annual, perennials (Herbaceous border) or a mixture of perennials and shrubs (Mixed border)

See also
 
 
 

 Boarder (disambiguation)
 Bordar, ranked below a serf in the social hierarchy of a manor
 Bordeaux (disambiguation)
 Bordure, in heraldry
 Bored (disambiguation)
 Borderline (disambiguation)
 On the Border (disambiguation)
 Republic of Ireland–United Kingdom border, sometimes referred to as the Irish border or British-Irish border
 Border campaign (Irish Republican Army)